Patrick Niklas (born 13 November 1987 in Eisenstadt) is an Austrian footballer who played club football from 2005 until 2011 as a midfielder.

External links
 Patrick Niklas at The Guardian
 

1987 births
Living people
People from Eisenstadt
Austrian footballers
Association football midfielders
Footballers from Burgenland
SC Wiener Neustadt players